The 5th Monkey is a Brazilian-American 1990 drama film directed and written by Éric Rochat and starring Ben Kingsley. The film was based on the novel Le Cinquieme Singe by Jacques Zibi. The Cannon Group founder Menahem Golan produced via his 21st Century Film Corporation, following the demise of Cannon.

The original music score was composed by Robert O. Ragland.

Plot
Cunda (Kingsley) lives deep in the Brazilian rainforest and is intent on making enough money so he can marry a widow in his village. However, his trade - capturing snakes for scientists - pays very little money, and he is in direct competition with other suitors.

One day, Cunda is bitten by a snake, and he crawls to the river to recover. While going through the agonizing recovery, he has an hallucination of four chimpanzees sitting in the river. Recovered, he returns home and finds the four chimpanzees waiting for him, and his efforts to shoo them away fail. Knowing that chimpanzees are not native to Brazil, he decides that they are a kind of supernatural gift for him. Believing this, he decides to take them to "the city" to sell them.

The journey isn't easy from the start; he discovers that he can't tie them on a rope and drag them, and the only way is to coax them. They stumble into a gold-panning camp, where Cunda is forced to work in order to pay off an old debt. When one of the monkeys is taken as payment, Cunda must figure how to retrieve the monkey and escape. Later, he, the monkeys and the adults of a village are kidnapped by mercenaries. Cunda and the monkeys escape, along with a village woman who refuses to leave his side. Arriving at a small town, a confusing sequence results in one of the monkeys disappearing, and Cunda becoming the servant of the local rich woman who has taken it upon herself to take care of the monkeys. Cunda now has to solve these two problems, and deal with the fact of the village woman's attraction to him plus his growing fondness of the monkeys.

Cast
Ben Kingsley as Cunda
Silvia De Carvalho as Maria
Mika Lins as Octavia
Vera Fischer as Mrs. Watts

External links

English-language Brazilian films
1990 films
1990 romantic drama films
American romantic drama films
Brazilian drama films
Films about animal rights
Films about apes
Films about poverty
Films based on French novels
Films based on romance novels
Films about hunters
Films scored by Robert O. Ragland
Films set in Brazil
Films set in forests
Columbia Pictures films
Films produced by Menahem Golan
1990s English-language films
1990s American films